Accinctapubes is a genus of snout moths in the subfamily Epipaschiinae. It was described by Maria Alma Solis in 1993 and it is known from Costa Rica and Paraguay.

Species
 Accinctapubes albifasciata (Druce, 1902)
 Accinctapubes amplissima (Solis & Styer, 2003)
 Accinctapubes apicalis (Schaus, 1906)
 Accinctapubes chionopheralis Hampson, 1906

References

Epipaschiinae
Pyralidae genera